The FIFA U-17 World Championship 1997, the seventh edition of the tournament, was held in the cities of Cairo, Ismailia, Alexandria, and Port Said in Egypt between 4 September and 21 September 1997. Players born after 1 January 1980 could participate in this tournament.

Venues

Teams

Squads

Matches

Group A

Group B

Group C

Group D

Knockout stage

Quarterfinals

Semifinals

Playoff for 3rd place

Final

Result

Goalscorers

David of Spain won the Golden Shoe award for scoring seven goals. In total, 117 goals were scored by 73 different players, with only one of them credited as own goal.

7 goals
 David
5 goals
 Hashim Saleh
4 goals
 Fabio Pinto
 Owusu Afriyie
 Seydou Keita
3 goals
 Geovanni
 Matuzalem
 Ahmed Belal
 Awule Quaye
 Miguel Mateos Rego
2 goals

 Yaser Amer
 Adiel
 Ferrugem
 Jorginho
 Ronaldinho
 Juan Francisco Viveros
 Silvio Adzic
 Michael Coffie
 Edwin Santibanez
 Omar Gomez
 Ander
 David Sousa
 Ivan Sanchez
 Sergio Santamaría
 Sutee Suksomkit
 Taylor Twellman

1 goal

 Julio Marchant
 Luciano Galletti
 Mauro Marchano
 Alexander Ziervogel
 Rashed Al Dosari
 Salah Rashed
 Andrey
 Anailson
 Diogo
 Alonso Zuniga
 Claudio Maldonado
 Cristian Alvarez
 Manuel Villalobos
 Milovan Mirošević
 Juan Bautista Esquivel Lobo
 Eid Ezz
 Mahmoud Arabi
 Saleh Abou
 Benjamin Auer
 Sebastian Deisler
 Sebastian Kehl
 Steffen Hofmann
 Aziz Ansah
 Godwin Attram
 Johnson Eku
 Wisdom Abbey
 Aboubacar Guindo
 Drissa Coulibaly
 Mahamadou Diarra
 Fernando Arce
 Luis Ernesto Pérez
 Ricardo Mauricio Martínez
 Saul Salcedo
 Juma Al Mukhaini
 Mohsin Al Harbi
 Rahdwan Nairooz
 Salah Al Amri
 Corona
 Ivan Lopez
 Ivan Royo
 Juanjo Camacho
 Montree Matong
 Tom Tongdee
 Charles Rupsis
 Steven Totten

Own goal
 Mahfoudh Al Mukhaini (playing against Ghana)

Final ranking

External links
FIFA U-17 World Championship Egypt 1997, FIFA.com
FIFA Technical Report (Part 1), (Part 2) and (Part 3)

FIFA U-17 World Championship
International association football competitions hosted by Egypt
FIFA
Sports competitions in Cairo
Sport in Alexandria
Sport in Port Said
FIFA U-17 World Cup tournaments
September 1997 sports events in Africa
Football in Cairo